The 8th ceremony of the Feroz Awards was held at the Teatro Coliseum in Madrid, on 2 March 2021. The ceremony was hosted by Pilar Castro.

Originally scheduled to take place on 8 February 2021 at the Teatro Ciudad de Alcobendas in Alcobendas, the ceremony was postponed to 2 March and moved to the Teatro Coliseum in Madrid due to the introduction of restrictions related to the evolution of the COVID-19 pandemic in the Community of Madrid. Esty Quesada,  and  staged stand-up performances.

Winners and nominees
Nominations for seventeen categories were announced on 10 December 2020 in Madrid by Inma Cuesta and Andrés Velencoso. Nominations for Premio Especial and Best Documentary were announced on 21 December 2020. The awards were presented on 2 March 2021.

Winners are listed first, highlighted in boldface.

Film

Films with multiple nominations and awards

Television

Series with multiple nominations and awards

Feroz de Honor
Victoria Abril

References

Feroz
Feroz
Feroz
2021 in Madrid
March 2021 events in Spain